Hemipecten is a genus of scallops, marine bivalve molluscs in the family Pectinidae.

Species
Species within the genus Hemipecten include:
 Hemipecten forbesianus Adams & Reeve, 1849

References

Pectinidae
Bivalve genera